"Jamaica" is a song by Canadian rock group Bachman–Turner Overdrive that appears on the 1979 album Rock n' Roll Nights.  It features Jim Clench on lead vocals.  It was written by well-known songwriter Jim Vallance.  It was released as a single but did not chart.  The song, along with "Heartaches," was played live on American Bandstand in February 1979 to support the Rock n' Roll Nights album release.

Using different lyrics, Rick Springfield remade the song under the title "Kristina" on his 1982 album Success Hasn't Spoiled Me Yet.

References 

1978 songs
1979 singles
1982 songs
Bachman–Turner Overdrive songs
Rick Springfield songs
Songs written by Jim Vallance
Songs written by Rick Springfield
Songs about Jamaica